Benedicto Caldarella (born September 1, 1939) is an Argentine former Grand Prix motorcycle road racer. He won in his only Grand Prix race at the 1962 500cc Argentine Grand Prix. He ended the season ranked fifth overall. In 1970, he ran a Brabham BT 30 in the European Formula 2 Championship, for Automovil Club Argentina team, beside Carlos Reutemann.

Motorcycle Grand Prix results 

(key) (Races in italics indicate fastest lap)

References

1939 births
Argentine motorcycle racers
125cc World Championship riders
250cc World Championship riders
500cc World Championship riders
Living people